WKAK (branded as "Georgia 104.5") is a radio station serving Albany, Georgia and surrounding cities with a country music format. This station broadcasts on FM frequency 104.5 MHz and is under ownership of Rick Lambert and Bob Spencer, through licensee First Media Services, LLC.  Its studios are on Broad Avenue just west of downtown Albany, and the transmitter is located east of Albany.

On April 30, 2020, Cumulus Media sold its entire Albany cluster for First Media Services for $450,000. The sale was consummated on December 15, 2020.

On April 7, 2021, WKAK rebranded as "Georgia 104.5".

Previous logo

References

External links

Country radio stations in the United States
KAK
Radio stations established in 1963
1963 establishments in Georgia (U.S. state)